Alison Selina Hernandez (born December 1973) is a British politician, and the current Police and Crime Commissioner for Devon and Cornwall, representing the Conservative Party. She was elected to the post on 5 May 2016, succeeding the previous incumbent, Tony Hogg. She was re-elected in 2021.

Career 
Hernandez ran for re-election in 2021 and was bitten by a dog during campaigning.

Election expenses

Within days of her election, it was reported that Hernandez was being investigated by police over allegations she failed to properly declare election expenses that were submitted in her role as an election agent for Kevin Foster, Conservative candidate in the Torbay constituency during the 2015 general election. Hernandez was under investigation by the Independent Police Complaints Commission which is managing the probe by West Mercia Police in connection with the United Kingdom general election, 2015 party spending investigation. She faced calls from opposition politicians, including Plymouth City Council leader Tudor Evans, to step aside from the role of Police and Crime Commissioner while the investigation was ongoing. Hernandez addressed these concerns during her swearing in ceremony on 10 May: "I've had over 91,000 people elect me to office. I'm here for the people of Devon and Cornwall and the Isles of Scilly. I'm here to do a job – the police need support."

The Independent Police Complaints Commission referred the matter to the Crown Prosecution Service in April 2017. The CPS ruled on 10 May 2017 that there were no grounds for a criminal charge and the case was dropped.

Other controversies
Hernandez courted controversy in June 2017 when she suggested gun owners could engage with terrorists. This idea was swiftly dismissed by Deputy Chief Constable Paul Netherton due to the complexities of responding to such an incident and the confusion that may occur in identifying the attackers.

In February 2019 she revealed that she had been caught speeding, and had received a parking ticket.

Electoral record

References

1973 births
Living people
Police and crime commissioners in England
Conservative Party police and crime commissioners
21st-century British women politicians